Natalia Strózik (born 23 August 1995) is a Polish volleyball player. She plays for Budowlani Łódź in the Orlen Liga.

References

Living people
1995 births
Polish women's volleyball players
People from Tychy